This is a list of butterflies of Somalia. About 131 species are known from Somalia, five of which are endemic.

Papilionidae

Papilioninae

Papilionini
Papilio nireus pseudonireus Felder & Felder, 1865
Papilio dardanus byatti Poulton, 1926
Papilio constantinus Ward, 1871
Papilio microps Storace, 1952

Leptocercini
Graphium colonna (Ward, 1873)

Pieridae

Coliadinae
Eurema brigitta (Stoll, [1780])
Eurema hecabe solifera (Butler, 1875)
Colias electo pseudohecate Berger, 1940

Pierinae
Colotis aurora evarne (Klug, 1829)
Colotis celimene praeclarus (Butler, 1886)
Colotis chrysonome (Klug, 1829)
Colotis daira stygia (Felder & Felder, 1865)
Colotis danae eupompe (Klug, 1829)
Colotis danae pseudacaste (Butler, 1876)
Colotis euippe complexivus (Butler, 1886)
Colotis euippe exole (Reiche, 1850)
Colotis evenina casta (Gerstaecker, 1871)
Colotis fausta mijurteina Carpenter, 1951
Colotis halimede restricta Talbot, 1939
Colotis hetaera lorti (Sharpe, 1896)
Colotis liagore (Klug, 1829)
Colotis phisadia phisadia (Godart, 1819)
Colotis phisadia somalica Storace, 1948
Colotis pleione heliocaustus (Butler, 1886)
Colotis protomedia (Klug, 1829)
Colotis regina (Trimen, 1863)
Colotis venosa (Staudinger, 1885)
Colotis vesta (Reiche, 1850)
Colotis vestalis castalis (Staudinger, 1884)
Colotis agoye zephyrus (Marshall, 1897)
Pinacopterix eriphia melanarge (Butler, 1886)
Nepheronia buquetii (Boisduval, 1836)
Euchloe belemia abyssinica Riley, 1928
Euchloe falloui (Allard, 1867)

Pierini
Pontia distorta (Butler, 1886)
Pontia glauconome Klug, 1829
Mylothris agathina (Cramer, 1779)
Belenois aurota (Fabricius, 1793)
Belenois creona benadirensis (Storace, 1948)
Belenois rubrosignata peeli Dixey, 1900
Belenois thysa tricolor Talbot, 1943

Lycaenidae

Poritiinae

Liptenini
Alaena johanna Sharpe, 1890
Ornipholidotos peucetia peuceda (Grose-Smith, 1889)
Baliochila fragilis Stempffer & Bennett, 1953

Aphnaeinae
Chloroselas arabica (Riley, 1932)
Chloroselas esmeralda Butler, 1886
Chloroselas ogadenensis Jackson, 1966 (endemic)
Cesa waggae (Sharpe, 1898) (endemic)
Cigaritis acamas bellatrix (Butler, 1886)
Cigaritis gilletti (Riley, 1925) (endemic)
Cigaritis somalina (Butler, 1886)
Axiocerses harpax kadugli Talbot, 1935
Axiocerses jacksoni Stempffer, 1948
Aphnaeus hutchinsonii Trimen & Bowker, 1887

Theclinae
Hypolycaena liara Druce, 1890
Leptomyrina gorgias sobrina Talbot, 1935
Iolaus glaucus Butler, 1886
Iolaus mimosae berbera (Bethune-Baker, 1924)
Iolaus tajoraca Walker, 1870
Iolaus umbrosa (Butler, 1886)
Iolaus crawshayi maureli Dufrane, 1954
Stugeta bowkeri albeza (Koçak, 1996)
Stugeta somalina Stempffer, 1946
Deudorix livia (Klug, 1834)

Polyommatinae

Lycaenesthini
Anthene contrastata turkana Stempffer, 1936
Anthene crawshayi minuta (Bethune-Baker, 1916)
Anthene janna Gabriel, 1949
Anthene opalina Stempffer, 1946
Anthene otacilia dulcis (Pagenstecher, 1902)
Anthene pitmani somalina Stempffer, 1936

Polyommatini
Tuxentius cretosus lactinatus (Butler, 1886)
Tarucus grammicus (Grose-Smith & Kirby, 1893)
Tarucus kulala Evans, 1955
Tarucus legrasi Stempffer, 1948
Tarucus quadratus Ogilvie-Grant, 1899
Tarucus rosacea (Austaut, 1885)
Tarucus theophrastus (Fabricius, 1793)
Azanus jesous (Guérin-Méneville, 1849)
Euchrysops brunneus Bethune-Baker, 1923
Euchrysops lois (Butler, 1886)
Euchrysops migiurtiniensis Stempffer, 1946 (endemic)
Euchrysops nilotica (Aurivillius, 1904)
Chilades naidina (Butler, 1886)
Lepidochrysops fumosa (Butler, 1886)
Lepidochrysops polydialecta (Bethune-Baker, [1923])

Nymphalidae

Danainae

Danaini
Danaus dorippus (Klug, 1845)
Tirumala formosa neumanni (Rothschild, 1902)
Amauris albimaculata hanningtoni Butler, 1888
Amauris ochlea darius Rothschild & Jordan, 1903

Satyrinae

Satyrini
Lasiommata maderakal (Guérin-Méneville, 1849)
Bicyclus anynana (Butler, 1879)
Ypthima jacksoni Kielland, 1982
Ypthima simplicia Butler, 1876
Neocoenyra duplex Butler, 1886
Neocoenyra fulleborni Thurau, 1903
Neocoenyra rufilineata Butler, 1894 (endemic)
Physcaeneura leda (Gerstaecker, 1871)

Charaxinae

Charaxini
Charaxes jasius Poulton, 1926
Charaxes epijasius Reiche, 1850
Charaxes jasius pagenstecheri Poulton, 1926
Charaxes hansali Felder, 1867
Charaxes etesipe patrizii Storace, 1949
Charaxes zoolina (Westwood, [1850])

Nymphalinae

Nymphalini
Junonia terea fumata (Rothschild & Jordan, 1903)
Precis coelestina Dewitz, 1879
Precis limnoria (Klug, 1845)
Precis octavia (Cramer, 1777)
Hypolimnas deceptor (Trimen, 1873)
Hypolimnas misippus (Linnaeus, 1764)

Biblidinae

Biblidini
Byblia anvatara acheloia (Wallengren, 1857)

Limenitinae

Adoliadini
Bebearia orientis (Karsch, 1895)
Euphaedra neophron ellenbecki Pagenstrecher, 1902

Heliconiinae

Acraeini
Acraea anemosa Hewitson, 1865
Acraea chilo Godman, 1880
Acraea neobule Doubleday, 1847
Acraea braesia Godman, 1885
Acraea doubledayi Guérin-Méneville, 1849
Acraea mirabilis Butler, 1886
Acraea miranda Riley, 1920
Acraea oncaea Hopffer, 1855
Acraea serena (Fabricius, 1775)

Hesperiidae

Coeliadinae
Coeliades anchises (Gerstaecker, 1871)
Coeliades forestan (Stoll, [1782])
Coeliades pisistratus (Fabricius, 1793)

Pyrginae

Celaenorrhinini
Sarangesa phidyle (Walker, 1870)

Tagiadini
Abantis meneliki Berger, 1979

Carcharodini
Spialia colotes semiconfluens de Jong, 1978
Spialia doris (Walker, 1870)
Spialia mafa higginsi Evans, 1937
Spialia mangana (Rebel, 1899)

Hesperiinae

Aeromachini
Kedestes callicles (Hewitson, 1868)

Heteropterinae
Metisella willemi (Wallengren, 1857)

See also
List of moths of Somalia
Wildlife of Somalia

References

Seitz, A. Die Gross-Schmetterlinge der Erde 13: Die Afrikanischen Tagfalter. Plates
Seitz, A. Die Gross-Schmetterlinge der Erde 13: Die Afrikanischen Tagfalter. Text 

Somalia
Somalia
Fauna of Somalia
Butterflies